The Pandora Project is an action film released in 1998. The film stars Daniel Baldwin, Erika Eleniak, Tony Todd and Bo Jackson.

Film synopsis
When a former CIA agent steals a weapon that kills people without harming buildings, a former CIA associate has to stop him, all before getting married in a few days.

Cast
 Daniel Baldwin as Captain John Lacy
 Erika Eleniak as Wendy Lane
 Richard Tyson as Captain William Stenwick
 Tony Todd as CIA Director Garrett Houtman
 Bo Jackson as Manson
 Jeff Yagher as Bruce Bobbins

Production
John Terlesky directed the opening scene and several second unit shots.

Release
The film was released first in Spain during July 1998. On February 9, 1999, the film premiered on video in the United States.

References

External links
 
 

1998 films
1998 action films
1990s heist films
American action films
American heist films
CineTel Films films
Films about terrorism
Films directed by Jim Wynorski
Weapons of mass destruction in fiction
1998 directorial debut films
1990s English-language films
1990s American films